Kamenny Yar is a rural locality (a selo) and the administrative center of Kamennoyarsky Selsoviet, Chernoyarsky District, Astrakhan Oblast, Russia. The population was 988 as of 2010. There are 35 streets.

Geography 
Kamenny Yar is located on the Volga River, 71 km northwest of Chyorny Yar (the district's administrative centre) by road. Razdolny is the nearest rural locality.

References 

Rural localities in Chernoyarsky District